Operation Barisal was a code-name of naval operation conducted by Pakistan Navy intended to take control of the city of Barisal, East Pakistan from the Mukti Bahini and the dissidents of the Pakistan Defence Forces. It was the part of Operation Searchlight.

Since the starting of Searchlight, the Mukti Bahini had been staging large scale sabotage missions, disturbing the communications and signals operatives in East Pakistan. Naval Intelligence found traces to the city of Barisal, therefore decided to conduct the operation. Barisal was part of Searchlight and was to provide logistic support to the Pakistan Army, by first deploying the Pakistan Navy's gun boats and navy personnel on grounds.

References

External links

Barisal
Bangladesh Liberation War
Riverine warfare
Military history of Pakistan
Pakistan Marines
April 1971 events in Bangladesh
May 1971 events in Bangladesh
Barisal